The Lagos State Ministry of Physical Planning and Urban Development is the state government ministry, charged with the responsibility to plan, devise and implement the state policies on Physical Planning and Urban Development.
The ministry is headed by a commissioner, who is assisted by the Permanent Secretary.

See also 
Lagos State Ministry of Justice

References 

Government of Lagos State